Neoprene (also polychloroprene) is a family of synthetic rubbers that are produced by polymerization of chloroprene. Neoprene exhibits good chemical stability and maintains flexibility over a wide temperature range. Neoprene is sold either as solid rubber or in latex form and is used in a wide variety of commercial applications, such as laptop sleeves, orthopaedic braces (wrist, knee, etc.), electrical insulation, liquid and sheet-applied elastomeric membranes or flashings, and automotive fan belts.

Production
Neoprene is produced by free-radical polymerization of chloroprene. In commercial production, this polymer is prepared by free radical emulsion polymerization. Polymerization is initiated using potassium persulfate. Bifunctional nucleophiles, metal oxides (e.g. zinc oxide), and thioureas are used to crosslink individual polymer strands.

History
Neoprene was invented by DuPont scientists on April 17, 1930, after Dr Elmer K. Bolton of DuPont attended a lecture by Fr Julius Arthur Nieuwland, a professor of chemistry at the University of Notre Dame. Nieuwland's research was focused on acetylene chemistry and during the course of his work he produced divinyl acetylene, a jelly that firms into an elastic compound similar to rubber when passed over sulfur dichloride. After DuPont purchased the patent rights from the university, Wallace Carothers of DuPont took over commercial development of Nieuwland's discovery in collaboration with Nieuwland himself and DuPont chemists Arnold Collins, Ira Williams and James Kirby. Collins focused on monovinyl acetylene and allowed it to react with hydrogen chloride gas, manufacturing chloroprene.

DuPont first marketed the compound in 1931 under the trade name DuPrene, but its commercial possibilities were limited by the original manufacturing process, which left the product with a foul odor. A new process was developed, which eliminated the odor-causing byproducts and halved production costs, and the company began selling the material to manufacturers of finished end-products. To prevent shoddy manufacturers from harming the product's reputation, the trademark DuPrene was restricted to apply only to the material sold by DuPont. Since the company itself did not manufacture any DuPrene-containing end products, the trademark was dropped in 1937 and replaced with a generic name, neoprene, in an attempt "to signify that the material is an ingredient, not a finished consumer product". DuPont then worked extensively to generate demand for its product, implementing a marketing strategy that included publishing its own technical journal, which extensively publicized neoprene's uses as well as advertising other companies' neoprene-based products. By 1939, sales of neoprene were generating profits over $300,000 for the company.

Applications

General

Neoprene resists degradation more than natural or synthetic rubber.  This relative inertness makes neoprene well suited for demanding applications such as gaskets, hoses, and corrosion-resistant coatings. It can be used as a base for adhesives, noise isolation in power transformer installations, and as padding in external metal cases to protect the contents while allowing a snug fit. It resists burning better than exclusively hydrocarbon based rubbers, resulting in its appearance in weather stripping for fire doors and in combat related attire such as gloves and face masks. Because of its tolerance of extreme conditions, neoprene is used to line landfills. Neoprene's burn point is around 260 °C (500 °F).

In its native state, neoprene is a very pliable rubber-like material with insulating properties similar to rubber or other solid plastics.

Neoprene foam is used in many applications and is produced in either closed-cell or open-cell form. The closed-cell form is waterproof, less compressible and more expensive. The open-cell form can be breathable. It is manufactured by foaming the rubber with nitrogen gas, where the tiny enclosed and separated gas bubbles can also serve as insulation. Nitrogen gas is most commonly used for the foaming of Neoprene foam due to its inertness, flame resistance, and large range of processing temperatures.

Civil engineering
Neoprene is used as a component of elastomeric bridge bearings, to support heavy loads while permitting small horizontal movements.

Aquatics
Neoprene is a popular material in making protective clothing for aquatic activities. Foamed neoprene is commonly used to make fly fishing waders, wetsuits, and drysuits as it provides excellent insulation against cold. The foam is quite buoyant, and divers compensate for this by wearing weights. Since foam neoprene contains gas pockets, the material compresses under water pressure, getting thinner at greater depths; a 7 mm neoprene wet suit offers much less exposure protection under 100 feet of water than at the surface. A recent advance in neoprene for wet suits is the "super-flex" variety, which uses spandex in the knit liner fabric for greater flexibility and stretch.  A drysuit is similar to a wetsuit, but uses thicker and more durable neoprene to create an entirely waterproof suit that is suitable for wear in extremely cold water or polluted water.

Home accessories
Recently, neoprene has become a favorite material for lifestyle and other home accessories including laptop sleeves, tablet holders, remote controls, mouse pads, and cycling chamois.

Music
The Rhodes piano used hammer tips made of neoprene in its electric pianos, after changing from felt hammers around 1970.

Neoprene is also used for speaker cones and drum practice pads.

Hydroponic gardening
Hydroponic and aerated gardening systems make use of small neoprene inserts to hold plants in place while propagating cuttings or using net cups. Neoprene is a good choice for supporting plants because of its flexibility and softness, allowing plants to be held securely in place without the chance of causing damage to the stem. Neoprene root covers also help block out light from entering the rooting chamber of hydroponic systems, allowing for better root growth and helping to deter the growth of algae.

Face mask
During the COVID-19 global pandemic, Neoprene was identified by some health experts as an effective material to use for home made face masks. Some commercial face mask manufacturers that use Neoprene have claimed 99.9% filtration for particles as small as 0.1 microns. The size of Coronavirus is identified to be on average 0.125 microns.

Other

Neoprene is used for Halloween masks and masks used for face protection, for insulating CPU sockets when extreme overclocking at subzero temperatures, to make waterproof automotive seat covers, in liquid and sheet-applied elastomeric roof membranes or flashings, and in a neoprene-spandex mixture for manufacture of wheelchair positioning harnesses.

In tabletop wargames, neoprene mats printed with grassy, sandy, icy, or other natural features have become popular gaming surfaces. They are durable, firm and stable, and attractive in appearance, and also favoured for their ability to roll up in storage but lie flat when unrolled.

Because of its chemical resistance and overall durability, neoprene is sometimes used in the manufacture of dishwashing gloves, especially as an alternative to latex.

In fashion, neoprene has been used by designers such as Gareth Pugh, Balenciaga, Rick Owens, Lanvin and Vera Wang. This trend, promoted by street style bloggers such as Jim Joquico of Fashion Chameleon, gained traction and trickled down to mainstream fashion around 2014.

Precautions
Some people are allergic to neoprene while others can get dermatitis from thiourea residues left from its production. The most common accelerator in the vulcanization of polychloroprene is ethylene thiourea (ETU), which has been classified as reprotoxic. The European rubber industry project called SafeRubber focused on alternatives to the use of ETU.

See also
 Isoprene

References

External links

 Historical Files on Neoprene are available at Hagley Museum and Library

American inventions
Brand name materials
Dielectrics
DuPont products
Elastomers
U.S. Synthetic Rubber Program